Nocturnal is the fourth studio album and second international album by Malaysian singer-songwriter Yuna. It was released on 29 October 2013 by Verve Records. The album was preceded by the release of the lead single "Rescue", which was released on 27 August 2013. Nocturnal debuted and peaked at number 27 on the Billboard Heatseekers Albums chart.

Background and development
On 4 September 2013, Yuna released the cover artwork for Nocturnal, which depicts her in a floral foreground setting. The official track listing for the album was confirmed by Artistdirect on 13 September. On 25 October, the album was made available for streaming in full before it was released.

Singles
"Rescue" was released as Nocturnals lead single on 27 August 2013. It garnered a positive review from MTV Hive, who described the song as a "kick-yourself-in-the-ass ray of sunshine". On 24 September, an official lyric video for the single was released, in which fans were asked to submit Polaroid images with the song's lyrics written beneath them.

Critical reception

Upon release, Nocturnal received rave reviews from contemporary music critics.  Matt Collar of AllMusic rated the album four out of five stars, stating that it delivers a "delicate girl power vibe", while comparing Yuna's vocals to those of Sixpence None the Richer's Leigh Nash and English recording artist Ellie Goulding. The Boston Globes Ken Capobianco gave the album a positive review, noting that it "fleshes out her [Yuna's] acoustic soul while moving toward dance territory". MTV Iggys Laura Studarus described the album as a guide towards a twinking blend of different genres.

Track listing

Charts

Release history

References

Yuna (singer) albums
2013 albums
Verve Records albums